The surname Julien may refer to:
 André Julien (disambiguation)
 Bernard Julien (born 1950), an English cricketer
 Charles-André Julien (1891-1991), a French journalist and historian
 Christina Julien (born 1988), a Canadian football player
 Claude Julien (disambiguation)
 Denis Julien (c.1772-?), an American fur trapper of French Huguenot origin
 Denyse Julien (born 1960), a Canadian badminton player
 Franck Julien (born 1966), a French businessman
 Guy Julien (born 1945), a politician from Quebec
 Henri Julien (1852–1908), a French Canadian artist and cartoonist
 Isaac Julien (born 1960), an English installation artist and filmmaker
 Marcus Julien (born 1986), a Grenadian football player
 Max Julien (born 1945), an American actor
 Naomi Julien, a fictional character from the BBC soap opera EastEnders
 Pauline Julien (1928–1998), a Quebec singer, songwriter, actress and feminist activist
 Pierre Julien (1731–1804), a French sculptor
 Sandra Julien (born 1950), a French actress
 Shane Julien (1956–1992), a West Indian cricketer
 Stanislas Julien (c.1797-1873), a French sinologist
 Stephane Julien (born 1974), a French-Canadian professional ice hockey player

See also 
 Julien (disambiguation)